The 12th New York Infantry Regiment was an infantry regiment in the Union Army during the American Civil War.

Service

3 Month Service of the 12th New York State Militia
The 12th New York Volunteer Infantry is sometimes confused with the 12th New York State Militia, a distinguished regiment formed in 1847 and which left New York City on April 21, 1861, for three months' service under the command of Colonel Daniel Butterfield.

The 12th New York State Militia was not the same regiment as the 12th New York volunteers, though in February 1862 it did furnish a five-company battalion for the 12th Volunteers, and Henry A. Weeks of the militia regiment took command of the 12th Volunteers as a result. Remaining 12th New York militiamen stayed in New York City with their regiment, which was activated for federal service twice more during the war. Compounding the 12th Volunteers/12th Militia confusion is the fact that Butterfield at one point commanded the brigade in which the 12th New York Volunteers served. Also, as indicated by inscriptions on the 12th New York's monument at Gettysburg, at least some of its veterans considered the two 12th New York regiments to be one and the same.

2 Year
The 12th New York Volunteer Infantry was organized at Elmira, New York and mustered in May 8, 1861 for two years' state service under the command of Colonel Ezra L. Walrath. On May 13, 1861 the regiment was re-mustered for three months' federal service and again re-mustered on August 2, 1861 for two years' state service.

The regiment was attached to Richardson's Brigade, Tyler's Division, McDowell's Army of Northeast Virginia, June to August 1861. Richardson's Brigade, Division of the Potomac, to October 1861. Wadsworth's Brigade, McDowell's Division, Army of the Potomac, to March 1862. Butterfield's 3rd Brigade, Porter's 1st Division, III Corps, Army of the Potomac, to May 1862. 3rd Brigade, 1st Division, V Corps, to May 1863. Headquarters, V Corps, to June 1864.

The 12th New York Infantry mustered out of the service on May 17, 1863. Men who had enlisted for three years' service were consolidated into two companies and served duty as Provost Guard for Headquarters of V Corps under the command of Captain Henry W. Ryder. These two companies ceased to exist on June 2, 1864 when their members were transferred to the 5th New York Infantry as Companies E and F. Although transferred to the 5th, the two former 12th New York companies remained on duty at corps headquarters.

Detailed service
Moved to Washington, D.C., May 29, 1861. Duty in the defenses of Washington, D.C., until July 16, 1861. Advance on Manassas, Va., July 16–21. First Battle of Bull Run July 21. Upton's Hill August 27. Duty in the defenses of Washington, D.C. until March 10, 1862. Advance on Manassas, Va., March 10. Moved to the Virginia Peninsula March 22–24. Warwick Road April 5. Siege of Yorktown April 5-May 4. Before Yorktown April 11. Reconnaissance up the Pamunkey May 10. Reconnaissance to Hanover Court House May 26. Battle of Hanover Court House May 27. Operations about Hanover Court House May 27–29. Seven Days before Richmond June 25-July 1. Battle of Gaines's Mill July 27. White Oak Swamp and Turkey Bend June 30. Malvern Hill July 1. Duty at Harrison's Landing until August 16. Movement to Fort Monroe, then to Centreville August 16–28. Pope's Campaign in northern Virginia August 28-September 2. Second Battle of Bull Run August 30. Maryland Campaign September 6–22. Battle of Antietam September 16–17. Shepherdstown September 19. At Sharpsburg, Md., until October 30. Movement to Falmouth, Va., October 30-November 19. Battle of Fredericksburg December 12–15. Expedition to Richard's and Ellis' Fords December 29–30. "Mud March" January 20–24, 1863. At Falmouth until April. Chancellorsville Campaign April 27-May 6. Battle of Chancellorsville May 1–5.  Participated in the Gettysburg Campaign June 11-July 24, 1863. Battle of Gettysburg July 1–3. Bristoe Campaign October 9–22. Advance to line of the Rappahannock November 7–8. Mine Run Campaign November 26-December 2. Campaign from the Rapidan to the James May 3-June 2. Battle of the Wilderness May 5–7. Spotsylvania May 8–12. Spotsylvania Court House May 12–21. North Anna River May 23–26. On line of the Pamunkey May 26–28. Totopotomoy May 28–31.

Casualties
The regiment lost a total of 124 men during service; 3 officers and 61 enlisted men killed or mortally wounded, 1 officer and 59 enlisted men died of disease.

Commanders
 Colonel Daniel Butterfield - commander of the three-month regiment
 Colonel Ezra L. Walrath - first commander of the two-year regiment
 Colonel George W. Snyder
 Colonel Henry A. Weeks - commanded the 12th New York battalion of three-year volunteers that joined the two-year regiment in the field, and commanded the two-year regiment as a result
 Colonel Benjamin A. Willis
 Major Henry W. Ryder - promoted from captain January 1, 1864

Notable members
Captain George W. Cole, Company H - major general by brevet after commanding 2nd United States Colored Cavalry
Private Boston Corbett, Company I - later famous for shooting and killing John Wilkes Booth, assassin of Abraham Lincoln, while a Sergeant in the 16th New York Cavalry Regiment
Corporal James E. Cross, Company K - Medal of Honor recipient for action at the Battle of Blackburn's Ford
Surgeon Henry Draper, Company S from May 31 to October 8, 1862
Assistant Surgeon John Christopher Draper, Company S from May 31 to October 8, 1862
Private Charles F. Rand, Company K - Medal of Honor recipient for action at the Battle of Blackburn's Ford

See also

 List of New York Civil War regiments
 New York in the Civil War

Notes

References
 Dyer, Frederick H. A Compendium of the War of the Rebellion (Des Moines, IA:  Dyer Pub. Co.), 1908.
 Tilney, Robert. My Life in the Army: Three Years and a Half with the Fifth Army Corps, Army of the Potomac 1862-1865 (Philadelphia: Ferris & Leach), 1912.
Attribution

External links
 Monument to the 12th New York Infantry and 44th New York Infantry at Gettysburg

Military units and formations established in 1861
1861 establishments in New York (state)
Military units and formations disestablished in 1861
Military units and formations disestablished in 1864
Infantry 012